The 2013 Japanese Super Cup was held on 23 February 2013 between the 2012 J. League champions Sanfrecce Hiroshima and the 2012 Emperor's Cup winner Kashiwa Reysol. Sanfrecce Hiroshima won the match 1–0 after a Hisato Satō goal.

Background

Match

See also
2012 J. League Division 1
2012 Emperor's Cup

References

Japanese Super Cup
Super Cup
Kashiwa Reysol matches
Sanfrecce Hiroshima matches
Sports competitions in Tokyo